The 1953–54 Rugby Football League season was the 59th season of rugby league football played in England. The championship, which involved thirty teams, started in August, 1953 and culminated in a finals play-off series in April, 1954 which resulted in a championship final between Warrington and Halifax. The season was also punctuated by the 1954 Rugby League World Cup, the first ever, and is also notable for its Challenge Cup final, which was drawn and had to be re-played, attracting a world record crowd for a rugby football match of either code.

Season summary
The 1953–54 season saw Brian Bevan become the highest try scorer in rugby league history when he passed the 446 tries mark set by Alf Ellaby.

League Champions: Warrington (8-7 v Halifax)
Challenge Cup Winners: Warrington (8-4 v Halifax in replay after 4–4 draw)

Warrington won the Lancashire League, and Halifax won the Yorkshire League. St. Helens beat Wigan 16–8 to win the Lancashire County Cup, and Bradford Northern beat Hull F.C. 7–2 to win the Yorkshire County Cup.
One oddity of the season was that Double winners Warrington, who only lost 5 league games, were beaten by both the bottom Lancashire club, Liverpool City and the bottom Yorkshire club, Hull Kingston Rovers.

Championship

Ladder

Play-offs

Semi-finals
Halifax 18, Workington Town 7.
Warrington 11, St Helens 0.

Final
The Championship Final was played between Warrington and Halifax on 8 May (three days after the epic Challenge Cup re-play) at Maine Road before a crowd of 36,519. The match was televised by the BBC and it was a tremendous defensive effort that helped Warrington to a narrow 8–7 win, with Bath kicking 4 goals.

Challenge Cup

The 1954 Challenge Cup was the 53rd staging of rugby league's oldest knockout competition, the Challenge Cup. It featured clubs from the 1953–54 Northern Rugby Football League season and is notable for its Final which had to be replayed before possibly the largest crowd in rugby league history.

Sources

1953-54 Northern Rugby Football League season at wigan.rlfans.com
1953-54 Northern Rugby Football League season at rlhalloffame.org.uk
1954 Challenge Cup final at rlhalloffame.org.uk
1954 Challenge Cup final at eraofthebiff.com
Warrington History (1945-1970) at warringtonwolves.org
The 1954 Odsal Challenge Cup final replay at rugbyleagueoralhistory.co.uk

1953 in English rugby league
1954 in English rugby league
Northern Rugby Football League seasons